Robert Cowan may refer to:

Robert Cowan (cricketer) (1880–1962), Australian cricketer
Robert Cowan (governor) (died 1737), Irish MP
Robert Cowan (ice hockey) (born 1983), Canadian ice hockey defenceman
Robert E. Cowan (1830–1887), American lawyer and politician
Rob Cowan (born 1948), English music broadcaster and writer
Rob Cowan (urbanist) (born 1950), British writer, editor and cartoonist
Bob Cowan (curler) (Robert A. Cowan), Scottish curler, journalist, curling historian, blogger.

See also
Robert Cowen, United States federal judge